Uforia Audio Network is the radio broadcasting and music events division of TelevisaUnivision USA. Formerly known as Hispanic Broadcasting Corporation and Univision Radio, it is the eighth-largest radio broadcaster in the United States, and the largest specifically catering to Hispanic and Latino Americans. The company is headquartered in Los Angeles.

History

Univision, previously known as Hispanic Broadcasting Corp. (between 2000 and September 22, 2003) and Heftel Broadcasting Corp, was the result of a February 14, 1997 merger of Tichenor Media System, Inc., a private company based in Dallas, Texas, and Heftel Broadcasting, a public company based in Las Vegas, Nevada.

Tichenor had been in broadcasting since the 1940s. McHenry Tichenor operated a station (KGBS on 1240, later KGBT on 1530) in Harlingen, Texas. In 1950, they added KUNO Corpus Christi, Texas. Later station purchases were KIFN in Phoenix, Arizona; WGMA in Hollywood, Florida; & WACO-AM-FM and TV (construction permit) in Waco, Texas. In 1975, the company (then known as Harbenito radio) added KCOR (AM) and KQXT (FM) in San Antonio.

In 1981, the grandson of the founder, McHenry T. Tichenor, Jr., was named president of the company. He began focusing on its Spanish Language stations; Waco, Hollywood, and Phoenix were sold to their local managers. In 1987 Tichenor bought WOJO, a Spanish-language FM station serving Chicago. In 1984, the company sold KQXT in San Antonio to Westinghouse's Group W Broadcasting and purchased KLAT (AM) in Houston, Texas from Marcos Rodriguez, Sr. and Marcos A. Rodriguez. The KLAT purchase gave Tichenor access to top Spanish Radio talents Chuck Brooks, Ricardo del Castillo (who later became COO, retired and has since passed) and Gary Stone (former President of Univision Radio-retired). In 1985, WIND, Chicago and KYSR AM-FM El Paso were purchased. More stations were purchased in the following years, and the home office moved from Harlingen to Dallas, Texas. Mac Tichenor, Jr.'s brother, Warren (who would later serve as U.S. Ambassador to the United Nations), became general manager of the San Antonio stations in 1991.

Heftel Broadcasting was founded by Cecil Heftel, whose family and in-laws all had been in the broadcasting business. His Heftel Broadcasting in the 1950s and early 1960s was anchored by KIMN in Denver and KGMB AM and KGMB-TV in Honolulu. He added numerous large AM radio stations (KTNQ) and some promising FM stations (KLVE) before selling them in the seventies and eighties. Cecil Heftel was elected as a congressman representing Hawaii's first district in 1976; he would hold that office eleven years before resigning in 1987. During this time, his company was active, buying and selling stations in places like Indianapolis and Chicago. For about a year, Heftel and Scott Ginsburg (Statewide Communications) merged their holdings into H & G Communications.

In the early 90s, Heftel began to expand into more Spanish stations, and took steps to go public (new executive Carl Parmer). Heftel had a knack for making coalitions work, at least for a time, as in the H & G attempt. Heftel set up shop in Miami with local stations WAQI and WRTO, taking a minority interest. Heftel set up Rodriguez-Heftel Texas broadcasting along with Marcos A. Rodriguez (owner of KESS and other Dallas area stations and son of Marcos Rodriguez, Sr.). Stations were purchased outright in Los Angeles, Chicago, Las Vegas, and New York.

When HBC went public, Clear Channel Communications invested, taking in several steps up to a 20% interest. In 1996 Clear Channel tendered the shares owned by Heftel management. This got them about 62% of the company. They struck a deal to merge the new company with Tichenor Media, to be run by the Tichenor management. The deal closed in early 1997, and made for the first national Spanish Language broadcasting company.

The new company was worth $1 billion at closing and owned 38 stations. Holding were expanded for the next several years. San Francisco was added in 1996. Phoenix was added in 1999, and Fresno in 2000.

In May 2013, KAMA-FM has increased power to 10.5 kW. Other expanded and relocated stations include KFLC, KESS-FM and KDXX (FM) in the Dallas-Ft. Worth area, KBBT and KGSX in the San Antonio area, KLQV San Diego, and WADO (AM) New York. KKMR in the Phoenix, AZ area was recently granted a CP to change from class A to class C3, at a new site that will allow a 10 fold increase in its population covered. This app was started nearly a decade ago and was granted based on tweaks in the application done in 2006. Former CFO Jeff Hinson observed once that the station upgrade activity had increased the company's enterprise value by "almost $1 billion" (at a point when the company was selling to UVN for 3.5B).

In 1999, the company created a new entity, HBCI, Inc which was its interactive online presence. HBCi created a network of bilingual radio station web sites and a network of bilingual local city guide sites focused on the local Hispanic consumer in each of the markets the radio stations operated. HBCI achieved the rare milestone of reaching profitability in the dotcom industry just prior to the merger with Univision.

The company traded on the NASDAQ exchange under the symbol HBCCA. It moved to the New York Stock Exchange in May 2000. Stock traded as HSP.

In mid-2002, Univision and HBC voted to merge. The approval process was long and controversial. The deal was approved and closed on September 22, 2003.

After the merger of HBC and Univision, the division was renamed Univision Radio and Denver Colorado.

In 2013, Univision launched Uforia, a new streaming platform featuring the Univision Radio stations and other exclusive content relating to Latino music.

On March 5, 2019, Univision announced that it would re-launch the Uforia brand (with the new tagline "The Home of Latin Music"), and that the Univision Radio group had been officially renamed Uforia Audio Network. There are also plans to use the Uforia brand more extensively across platforms, including live events, as well as television programming.

Some of the syndicated shows in the Uforia Audio Network include "El Show De Raul Brindis", “El Bueno, La Mala y El Feo” (“The Good, The Bad and The Ugly”), "El Show de Omar y Argelia”, "El Frey Guey Show", "La Chula Y La Bestia' “El Hit Parade de América con Javier Romero”, "Todo Deportes con Broderick Zerpa", and “Intimo con Alberto Sardiñas”.

On June 3, 2022, Latino Media Network, a new media company founded by social entrepreneurs Stephanie Valencia and Jess Morales Rocketto and backed by several Latino luminaries including former Univision co-anchor Maria Elena Salinas has announced it will acquire TelevisaUnivision’s radio properties in ten markets for $60 million.

List of Radio stations
Below is a list of radio stations that are currently owned by Univision. As of November 28, 2018, it owns 61 radio stations: 49 local stations in 15 different markets (including Puerto Rico) and the other 12 as national stations.

Each section is in order by call sign.

Arizona
Phoenix
KHOT-FM 105.9 FM - Regional Mexican
KOMR 106.3 FM - Spanish AC
KQMR/KHOV-FM 100.3 FM/105.1 FM - Spanish Top 40

California
Fresno
KLLE1 107.9 FM - Regional Mexican
KOND1 107.5 FM - Regional Mexican
KRDA1 92.1 FM - Spanish AC
Los Angeles
KLVE 107.5 FM - Spanish AC
KRCD/KRCV 103.9 FM/98.3 FM - Spanish Adult Hits
KSCA 101.9 FM - Regional Mexican
KTNQ1 1020 AM - Spanish News/Talk 
San Diego
KLNV 106.5 FM - Regional Mexican
KLQV 102.9 FM - Spanish AC 
San Francisco (including San Jose and Oakland)
KBRG 100.3 FM - Spanish AC
KSOL/KSQL 98.9 FM/99.1 FM - Regional Mexican
KVVF/KVVZ 105.7 FM/100.7 FM - Spanish Top 40

Florida
Miami
WAMR-FM 107.5 FM - Spanish AC
WAQI1 710 AM - Spanish News/Talk
WQBA1 1140 AM - Spanish Sports Talk
WRTO-FM 98.3 FM - Spanish Tropical

Illinois
Chicago
WOJO 105.1 FM - Regional Mexican
WPPN 106.7 FM - Spanish AC
WRTO1 1200 AM - Spanish Sports Talk
WVIV-FM 93.5 FM - Spanish Top 40

Nevada
Las Vegas
KISF1 103.5 FM - Regional Mexican
KLSQ1 870 AM - Spanish Sports
KRGT1 99.3 FM - Spanish Top 40

New York
New York City
WADO1 1280 AM - Spanish Sports
WXNY-FM 96.3 FM - Spanish Top 40

Puerto Rico
San Juan
WKAQ2  580 AM - Spanish News/Talk
WKAQ-FM2  104.7 FM - Bilingual Top 40
Ponce
WUKQ 1420 AM - Spanish News/Talk
Mayagüez
WYEL 600 AM - Spanish News/Talk
WUKQ-FM 98.7 FM - Bilingual Top 40

Texas
Austin
KLJA 107.7 FM - Spanish AC
KLQB 104.3 FM - Regional Mexican
Dallas/Fort Worth
KDXX/KESS-FM 107.9 FM/107.1 FM - Spanish Top 40
KFLC1 1270 AM - Spanish Sports Talk
KFZO1 99.1 FM - Regional Mexican
KLNO 94.1 FM - Regional Mexican
Houston
KAMA-FM 104.9 FM - Spanish Top 40
KLAT1/KQBU-FM 1010 AM/93.3 FM - Spanish Sports Talk
KLTN 102.9 FM - Regional Mexican
KOVE-FM 106.5 FM - Spanish AC
McAllen
KBTQ1 96.1 FM - Spanish Oldies
KGBT1 1530 AM - Spanish Sports Talk
KGBT-FM1 98.5 FM - Regional Mexican
San Antonio
KBBT 98.5 FM - Rhythmic CHR
KMYO 95.1 FM - Spanish AC
KROM 92.9 FM - Regional Mexican
KVBH 107.5 FM - Rhythmic AC
KXTN1 1350 AM - Tejano
1 - Sale of these stations to Latino Media Network pending.
2 - Sale of these stations to Hemisphere Media Group pending.

Nationwide
Amor Celestial - Spanish Christian and Catholic
Área 53 - Cubatón (Upbeat Cuban Music)
Becky G Radio - Songs from the artist and other pop artists
Betty - Spanish Ballads from the 1980s and ’90s
El Sancho - Regional Mexican, mainly Corridos
Jenni Rivera - Songs from the late artist
¡Kumbiazo! - Cumbias
Mami - Classic Salsa and Tropical
Planeta Rock - Spanish Rock
Trap Radio - Explicit Latin Trap
Uforia Debut - Trending and newly released music
TUDN Radio - Spanish Sports Talk from the network, TUDN
Qué Buena Nueva York - Online Only, offering music from the former WQBU-FM station

References

Univision Radio Network stations
American radio networks
Radio stations established in 1981
Radio broadcasting companies of the United States
Spanish-language radio stations in the United States